Welcome to Hard Times is the debut 1960 novel by American author E. L. Doctorow.  It is set in a small settlement in the Dakota Territory named Hard Times. After a reckless drifter comes into Hard Times and terrorizes the town with rape, murder and arson, the survivors lead an effort to restore it.  A theme throughout the novel is the nature of good and evil, represented by the townspeople's fear of "The Bad Man from Bodie".
The New York Times relates the book to Joseph Conrad's Heart of Darkness:

Perhaps the primary theme of the novel is that evil can only be resisted psychically: when the rational controls that order man's existence slacken, destruction comes. Conrad said it best in Heart of Darkness, but Mr. Doctorow has said it impressively. His book is taut and dramatic, exciting and successfully symbolic.

Film adaptation

References

1960 American novels
Novels by E. L. Doctorow
American novels adapted into films
Western (genre) novels
Novels set in Dakota Territory
Novels about rape
Simon & Schuster books
1960 debut novels